The Old Settler, elevation 2,132 m (6,995 ft), is the highest mountain in the southernmost part of the Lillooet Ranges of the Coast Mountains in British Columbia, Canada, located between the Fraser Canyon (E) and Harrison Lake (W) to the northeast of the town of Agassiz between Bear and Cogburn Creeks.

See also
Old Settler's Song (Acres of Clams)
Old Settlers' Association
Geography of British Columbia

References

External links
Aerial view of The Old Settler from above the Coquihalla Pass.  Coquihalla Range in foreground, Garibaldi Ranges in background.  The Old Settler is the central summit on the middle of the three ridges portrayed.

Mountains of the Lower Mainland
Lillooet Ranges
Two-thousanders of British Columbia
Yale Division Yale Land District